Planters Inn is a hotel in Savannah, Georgia, United States. It occupies the building at 29 Abercorn Street which was constructed in 1913. It stands in the southwestern trust/civic block of Reynolds Square, adjoining the Oliver Sturges House, which pre-dates it by exactly a century, being one of two houses originally on the plot. Formerly the John Wesley Hotel, Planters Inn was established in 1984. The inn has sixty rooms, and is in close proximity to the Olde Pink House restaurant.

Planters Inn is owned by the Charlestowne Hotels group.

See also
List of historic houses and buildings in Savannah, Georgia

References

External links
 Planters Inn official website
 Planters Inn on Reynolds Square – Savannah Chamber of Commerce

Hotels in Savannah, Georgia
Hotels established in 1913
Hotel buildings completed in 1913
Reynolds Square (Savannah) buildings
1913 establishments in Georgia (U.S. state)
Savannah Historic District